Honoured Cultural Worker of the RSFSR was an honorary title given by the Russian Soviet Federative Socialist Republic to qualified employees of institutions and organizations involved in culture, art, education, printing, print, radio and television. The nominees are participants of amateur creativity, many involved in volunteer work in their organizations and institutions. They have to have worked in the field for 15 or more years. The person is honored for his merits in the promotion, popularization, and preservation of culture. The title was established on May 26, 1964.

References

Russian literary awards
Russian music awards
Honorary titles of Russia
Honorary titles of the Soviet Union